This is a list of the main career statistics of professional tennis player John Newcombe.

Grand Slam finals

Singles: 10 (7 titles, 3 runner-ups)

Men's doubles (21)

Wins (17)

 A sudden-death tie-break instead of fifth set

Runner-ups (4)

Mixed doubles (3)

Wins (2)

Runner-up

Open Era finals 
As listed by the ATP website.

Singles

Doubles

Grand Slam tournament performance timeline

Singles

Source: ITF

References

External links
 
 
 
 

Tennis career statistics